Willie Perry Jr. (born May 31, 1971), best known as DJ Casper, is an American DJ and songwriter. Perry Jr. was raised in Englewood, Chicago, and is known as Casper because he almost always wears white clothing on stage. He is also known as Mr. C The Slide Man.

Perry's first hit record, "Casper Slide Pt. 1" – also known as "Cha Cha Slide" – was created by Perry for his nephew, who worked as a personal trainer at a Bally Total Fitness in 1998. After the song grew in popularity as an aerobic exercise at fitness clubs and PE in schools, Casper created a second song in 2000, titled "Casper Slide Pt. 2", which was picked up by Elroy Smith at Chicago's radio station, WGCI-FM.

The song became a hit in Chicago in 2004, when the city's M.O.B. Records record label became involved as well, helping Perry create a whole compilation album with other Chicago-based artists to promote the dance. "Cha Cha Slide" was later picked up by Universal Records.

In January 2016, Perry Jr. was diagnosed with kidney cancer and neuroendocrine cancer. After unsuccessful surgery the same month, he began chemotherapy. In an interview in July 2018, he stated he was in remission. In 2019, Perry stated that he beat his liver and kidney cancers and said he is a changed man, stating "that was God's way of just slowing me down just a little bit."

Perry makes an appearance as a DJ in a season 6 episode of Orange Is the New Black, in Crazy Eyes' hallucination of the prisoners and guards line dancing to the Cha Cha Slide.

Discography

Albums 
 Out Champ (1999)
 Casper (2001)
 I Love You (2022)

Singles

References

African-American songwriters
African-American DJs
Living people
1971 births
Musicians from Chicago
Songwriters from Illinois
21st-century African-American people
20th-century African-American people